Chapu (also Romanized as Chapū and Chapow) is a village in Chaharduli Rural District, Keshavarz District, Shahin Dezh County, West Azerbaijan Province, Iran. At the 2006 census, its population was 87, in 17 families.

References 

Populated places in Shahin Dezh County